Kory Scoran (born August 24, 1981, Winnipeg, Manitoba) is a Canadian former professional ice hockey defenceman. Former Division 1 Hockey player for Lake Superior State University before turning professional with the Idaho Steelheads of the ECHL for a total of four seasons, winning the Kelly Cup in 2006-07. Kory then joined the Tilburg Trappers in the Netherlands, before returning to North America to play for the Wichita Thunder of the Central Hockey League and then the Steelheads again. Scoran played a total of six professional seasons. He is now the Hockey Director at Idaho Ice World.

Career statistics

Awards
ECHL
 Defenseman of the Year Lake Superior State University 
 CCHA Defenseman of the week 
 Idaho Steelheads’ Most Improved Player - 2006-2007
 Won Kelly Cup with  Idaho Steelheads - 2007
 Selected to play in the All Star Game in 2010-2011 in the Netherlands
 Defenseman of the Year (Idaho Steelheads)
 Second all time in points for defenseman for the Idaho Steelheads(in the ECHL Era)

References

External links

1981 births
Living people
Canadian ice hockey defencemen
Idaho Steelheads (ECHL) players
Lake Superior State Lakers men's ice hockey players
Ice hockey people from Winnipeg
Wichita Thunder players